The triceps reflex, a deep tendon reflex, is a reflex that elicits involuntary contraction of the triceps brachii muscle.  It is sensed and transmitted by the radial nerve. The reflex is tested as part of the neurological examination to assess the sensory and motor pathways within the C7 and C8 spinal nerves.

Testing
The test can be performed by tapping the triceps tendon with the sharp end of a reflex hammer while the forearm is hanging loose at a right angle to the arm. A sudden contraction of the triceps muscle causes extension, and indicates a normal reflex.

Reflex arc 
The arc involves the stretch receptors in the triceps tendon, from where the information travels along the radial nerve, through the C7/C8 nerve root to the spinal cord, and the motor signal for contraction returns through the radial nerve.

Test indicators
 Absence of a reflex (areflexia): If no reflex is elicited then it is essential to try again with reinforcement, with the patient clenching his or her teeth just as the reflex hammer strikes. If true, it can indicate a lower motor neuron lesion or a problem in the neuromuscular junction.
 Hyperreflexia (a response far larger than considered normal): Indicates a potential upper motor neuron lesion...

Absence of reflex
An absence of reflex can be an indicator of several medical conditions: Myopathy, neuropathy, spondylosis, sensory nerve disease, neuritis, potential lower motor neuron lesion, or poliomyelitis.

Other medical problems that may cause irregular reflexes include Hyperthyroidism.

Notes

See also 
 Reflex arc
 Reflex
 Golgi tendon organ

References

External links 
 Illustration of reflex testing

Reflexes